Palaospeum is a genus of minute freshwater snails with an operculum, aquatic gastropod molluscs or micromolluscs in the family Moitessieriidae.

Species
 Palaospeum bertrandi Girardi, 2009
 Palaospeum bessoni (R. Bernasconi, 1999)
 Palaospeum hispanicum Boeters, 2003
 Palaospeum lopezsorianoi Quiñonero-Salgado & Rolán, 2017
 Palaospeum nanum Boeters & Bertrand, 2001
 Palaospeum septentrionale (Rolán & Ramos, 1996)

References

External links
 
 Boeters, H. D. (1999). Palaospeum n. gen. (Gastropoda Prosobranchia: Moitessieriidae). Unknown West European Prosobranchia, 10. Basteria. 63 (4/6): 193-197. Leiden.

Moitessieriidae